Oskars Kastēns (born July 19, 1971) is a Latvian journalist and a politician. He is a member of the LPP/LC and a deputy of the 9th Saeima (Latvian Parliament). He is the former Minister for Special Assignments for Society Integration Affairs.

Kastēns is also a member of the board of Global Panel America (Global Panel Foundation), a non-governmental organization.

References

External links 
Saeima website

1971 births
Living people
Politicians from Riga
Latvia's First Party politicians
Latvia's First Party/Latvian Way politicians
Deputies of the 8th Saeima
Deputies of the 9th Saeima
University of Latvia alumni